Jackie Kabler (born 1966) is a British freelance television presenter and reporter with QVC.

Kabler was born in Coventry, Warwickshire. She worked as a presenter and reporter for Channel Television and then ITV West. She then joined breakfast TV programme GMTV, where she worked for nine years, two as a reporter/producer and seven as a roving correspondent. Among the major stories Kabler covered for GMTV were: the Soham murders; interviewing Ian Huntley on live television days before his arrest for the murders; the impeachment of US President Clinton; the Washington, D.C. sniper attacks; the 2004 Athens Olympics, the 2004 Indian Ocean earthquake; the disappearance of Madeleine McCann.

In February 2013 she began presenting for QVC. She co-presents Ruth Langsford's Fashion Edit alongside Ruth Langsford for QVC.

References

External links

1970 births
Living people
English television presenters
BBC newsreaders and journalists
ITN newsreaders and journalists
ITV regional newsreaders and journalists
GMTV presenters and reporters